Our Lady of the Sphere is a 1969 American experimental film directed by Larry Jordan.

Summary
The experimental film features ambiguous characters (a boy, a deep-sea diver and a mystical lady with an orbital head)  on a surrealist dream-like journey  full of various imagery through juxtaposed with symbols and images from themes such as antiquity to the space age, accompanied by alternating backgrounds, before the film ends in a garden.

Legacy
Our Lady of the Sphere is now part of Anthology Film Archives' Essential Cinema Repertory collection. In 2010, it was selected for preservation by the National Film Registry.

See also
 List of American films of 1969
 1969 in film
 Cutout animation

References

External links
 Our Lady of the Sphere at Canyon Cinema
 
 MUBI
 Amazon.com

1960s avant-garde and experimental films
1969 short films
American animated short films
American avant-garde and experimental films
Animated films without speech
Collage film
United States National Film Registry films
1960s American films